The 2016 ICC World Cricket League Europe Division Two was an international 20-over cricket tournament played in Stockholm, Sweden, from 17 to 20 August 2016. It was the first official (ICC-approved) international cricket tournament to be played in Sweden.

Six teams participated in the tournament – Germany, Gibraltar, the Isle of Man, Israel, Spain, and Sweden. The tournament was heavily affected by the weather, with five out of the fifteen games being abandoned. The top two teams, Germany and Sweden, qualified for the 2017 ICC Europe Division One event. Germany finished undefeated, while Sweden were level with Israel and Spain on points, but had a superior net run rate. The leading run-scorer was Israel's Josh Evans, while the leading wicket-taker was another Israeli player, Srinath Arachichige.

The tournament featured the first international cricket match between Gibraltar and Spain. That match may also have been the first senior international between the two teams in any sport (Gibraltar being a disputed territory that is claimed by both Spain and the United Kingdom).

Squads

Points table

Matches

Statistics

Most runs
The top five run scorers (total runs) are included in this table.

Source: ESPNcricinfo

Most wickets

The top five wicket takers are listed in this table, listed by wickets taken and then by bowling average.

Source: ESPNcricinfo

See also
 European Cricket Championship

References

External links
 Series home at ESPN Cricinfo

International cricket competitions in 2016
International cricket competitions in Sweden
2016 in Swedish sport
World Cricket League